Vote for Love is a 1996 album by Kenny Rogers released exclusively for sale on QVC. It was later made available in retail stores under the title Always & Forever.

Track listing

Disc 1 
 "Have I Told You Lately" (Van Morrison) [4:55]
 (previously released by Van Morrison on the 1989 album Avalon Sunset)
 "As Time Goes By" (Herman Hupfeld) [2:51]
 (previously recorded by Rudy Vallee in 1931 and re-released in 1943)
 (used by Dooley Wilson in the 1942 film Casablanca)
 "Endless Love" (Lionel Richie) [3:50]
 (previously recorded by Lionel Richie and Diana Ross on the 1981 album Endless Love: The Original Motion Picture Soundtrack)
 "Unforgettable" (Irving Gordon) [3:21]
 (previously recorded by Nat King Cole on the 1951 album Penthouse Serenade)
 "I Only Have Eyes for You" (Harry Warren, Al Dubin) [4:21]
 (previously recorded by The Flamingos on the 1959 album Flamingo Serenade)
 (originally written for the 1934 film Dames)
 "Evergreen" (Barbra Streisand, Paul Williams) [3:35]
 (previously recorded by Barbra Streisand on the 1976 soundtrack A Star Is Born)
 "Misty" (Johnny Burke, Erroll Garner) [3:18]
 (previously recorded by Johnny Mathis on the 1959 album Heavenly)
 (previously recorded by Ray Stevens on the 1975 album Misty)
 "She Believes in Me" (Steve Gibb) [4:19]
 (from the 1978 album The Gambler)
 "Always" (Irving Berlin) [2:37]
 (written in 1925, previously used in the 1942 film The Pride of the Yankees)
 (covered by many artists including Frank Sinatra and Patsy Cline)
 "When I Fall in Love" (Edward Heyman, Victor Young) [3:25]
 (previously recorded by Doris Day in the 1952 film One Minute to Zero)
 "Crazy" (Willie Nelson) [3:17]
 (previously recorded by Patsy Cline in 1961)
 "When a Man Loves a Woman" (Sam M. Lewis, Andrew Wright) [3:51]
 (previously recorded by Percy Sledge on the 1966 album When a Man Loves a Woman)
 "You Decorated My Life" (Debbie Hupp, Bob Morrison) [3:45]
 (from the 1979 album Kenny)
 "I Can't Help Falling in Love" (Luigi Creatore, Hugo Peretti, George David Weiss) [3:18]
 (previously recorded by Elvis Presley on the 1961 soundtrack Blue Hawaii)
 "The Wind Beneath My Wings" (Larry Henley, Jeff Silbar) [3:36]
 (previously recorded by Bette Midler on the 1988 soundtrack Beaches)

Disc 2 
 "It Had to Be You" (Isham Jones, Gus Kahn) [2:39]
 (originally performed by Sam Lanin and his Orchestra in 1924)
 (has also appeared in numerous movies including the 1939 movie The Roaring Twenties - sung by Priscilla Lane)
 "I Swear" (Gary Baker, Frank J. Myers) [3:49]
 (previously recorded by John Michael Montgomery on the 1994 album Kickin' It Up)
 "Stardust" (Hoagy Carmichael, Mitchell Parish) [3:43]
 (previously recorded by Carmichael in 1927)
 (made popular by Isham Jones in 1930)
 "I Will Always Love You" (Dolly Parton) [2:59]
 (originally released by Dolly Parton on the 1974 album Jolene)
 (also covered by Whitney Houston on the 1992 soundtrack The Bodyguard)
 "You Send Me" (Sam Cooke) [3:10]
 (originally sung by Sam Cooke from the 1957 album Sam Cooke)
 "Through the Years" (Steve Dorff, Marty Panzer) [3:42]
 (from the 1981 album Share Your Love)
 "Unchained Melody" (Alex North, Hy Zaret) [3:28]
 (previously recorded by The Righteous Brothers from the 1965 album Just Once in My Life)
 "Lady" (Lionel Richie) [3:54]
 (from the 1980 album 1980 Greatest Hits)
 "Always and Forever" (Rod Temperton) [4:48]
 (previously recorded by Heatwave from the 1976 album Too Hot to Handle)
 "My Funny Valentine" (Lorenz Hart, Richard Rodgers) [4:07]
 (from the 1994 album Timepiece)
 "Somewhere My Love" (Maurice Jarre, Paul Francis Webster) [2:44]
 (previously recorded by Ray Conniff from the 1966 album Somewhere My Love)
 "You Are So Beautiful" (Bruce Fisher, Billy Preston) [3:09]
 (from the album We've Got Tonight)
 "You Light Up My Life" (Joe Brooks) [3:09]
 (previously recorded by Debby Boone from the 1977 album You Light Up My Life)
 (also used for the film of the same name)
 "Love Is a Many Splendored Thing" (Sammy Fain, Paul Francis Webster) [2:40]
 (previously recorded by The Four Aces in 1955)
 "Love Me Tender" (Vera Matson, Elvis Presley) [3:04]
 (previously recorded by Presley from the 1956 album Elvis)

References

1996 compilation albums
Kenny Rogers albums